Jantima Khunpiphat (born 29 August 1994) is a Thai footballer who plays as a goalkeeper. She has been a member of the Thailand women's national team.

International career
Jantima capped for Thailand at senior level during the 2015 AFF Women's Championship.

References

1994 births
Living people
Jantima Khunpiphat
Women's association football goalkeepers
Jantima Khunpiphat
Jantima Khunpiphat